Battery B, 1st West Virginia Light Artillery Regiment was an artillery battery that served in the Union Army during the American Civil War.

Service
Battery B was organized at Ceredo in western

Virginia on October 1, 1861.

Battery B was consolidated with Battery E, 1st West Virginia Light Artillery Regiment on December 31, 1864.

Casualties
The 1st West Virginia Light Artillery Regiment lost 33 men, killed and died of wounds; 131 men, died of disease, accident or in prison; total deaths, 164 men. (all 8 batteries)

[Source: Regimental Losses in the American Civil War, 1861–1865, by William F. Fox]

Commander
  Cpt Samuel Davey (October 1861 through March 1862)
  Cpt John V. Keeper (April 1, 1862 through December 31 1864)

References
The Civil War Archive
Theodore Lang, "Loyal West Virginia from 1861 to 1865", The Deutsch Publishing Co, Baltimore MD, 1895 pp 311 - 312

See also
West Virginia Units in the Civil War
West Virginia in the Civil War

Units and formations of the Union Army from West Virginia
Artillery units and formations of the American Civil War
1861 establishments in Virginia
Military units and formations established in 1861
Military units and formations disestablished in 1865